William Street South, commonly known as South William Street, (Irish: Plás Mhic Liam Theas) is a street located on Dublin's Southside.

Location 
It runs from the junction with Exchequer Street, Wicklow Street, and St. Andrew's Street on its northeastern end to the junction of Johnson Place and Stephen Street on its southwestern end.

History 
The street was laid out in 1676 by William Williams and was part of Dublin's 17th-century expansion beyond its medieval walls. The street has one of the largest and most complete groups of 18th century merchants' houses in the city. However, M'Cready claims the street is named after King William III.

In 2012, the street was rebranded as being the centre of Dublin's "Creative Quarter", an area noted for its "independent design stores, fashion outlets and cafes". The UK's Academy of Urbanism has noted that the street has transformed "from the bustling heart of the rag trade to a well-known spot for retail entrepreneurs, start-ups and those in search of a good night out".

Powerscourt House 
The street is dominated by Powerscourt House, the former Dublin townhouse of Viscount Powerscourt. It was constructed in the 18th century for Richard Wingfield, 3rd Viscount Powerscourt, a member of the Irish House of Lords. The townhouse was the Wingfield family's urban residence when they were visiting from the Powerscourt Estate in Enniskerry, County Wicklow.

Designed by Robert Mack, it dates from between 1771 and 1774. The court at the rear of the building was created with the addition of three brown-brick office buildings from 1809 to 1811. The townhouse was purchased and redeveloped as a shopping centre between 1978 and 1981 and is now known as the Powerscourt Townhouse Centre.

Gallery

See also 

 List of streets and squares in Dublin

References 

Streets in Dublin (city)
Shopping districts and streets in Ireland
1676 establishments in Ireland